Jacy is a unisex given name. Notable people with the name include:

 Jacy (footballer) (born 1997), Brazilian football player
 Jacy J. Hurst, American judge
 Jacy Reese Anthis (born 1992), American activist

See also
 Jace

Masculine given names